The Secret Life of Happy People is a 2006 Canadian comedy-drama film.

Plot
Thomas Dufresne (Marc Paquet) is the black sheep of his bourgeois family. One day, he meets a free-spirited waitress named Audrey (Catherine De Léan) who changes his life. Thomas eventually finds out the truth behind their seemingly innocent encounter, which may change his family forever.

Recognition
 2006 Borsos Competition for Best Canadian Film - Won
 2007 Claude Jutra Award - Stéphane Lapointe - Won (tied with Julia Kwan for Eve and the Fire Horse)
 2007 Jutra Award for Best Film - Roger FrappierLuc Vandal - Nominated
 2007 Genie Award for Best Achievement in Direction - Stéphane Lapointe - Nominated
 2007 Genie Award for Best Achievement in Music - Original Score - Pierre Desrochers - Nominated
 2007 Genie Award for Best Performance by an Actress in a Supporting Role - Marie Gignac - Nominated
 2007 Genie Award for Best Original Screenplay - Stéphane Lapointe - Nominated

References

External links
 
 

2006 films
2006 comedy-drama films
Quebec films
Best First Feature Genie and Canadian Screen Award-winning films
2006 directorial debut films
Canadian comedy-drama films
French-language Canadian films
2000s Canadian films